Abu Homeyzeh (also Romanized as Abū Ḩomeyẕeh, Abū Ḩamīzeh, and Abu Humaizah; also known as Abu Humaidhah and Şadr-e Abū Ḩomeyẕeh) is a city in Howmeh-ye Sharqi Rural District, in the Central District of Dasht-e Azadegan County, Khuzestan Province, Iran. At the 2006 census, its population was 5,247, in 865 families.

References 

Populated places in Dasht-e Azadegan County
Cities in Khuzestan Province